

Overview 
Namjung is a village development committee in Gorkha District in the Gandaki Zone of northern-central Nepal. At the time of the 1991 Nepal census it had a population of 3,370 and had 627 houses in the town.

References

Populated places in Gorkha District